Kaalong (Kàlòng) also known as Dimbong (Mbong), is an almost extinct Bantu language from the Center Province of Southern Cameroon. 

The language is commonly defined as some combination of seven sub-varieties: Maja, Zakan, Tingong, Mbong, Ripe (or Bapé), Kpa (or Bafia), and Ti'bea (or Djanti), however linguists have not reached a single consensus on what languages are and not distinct from Kaalong.

Many Kaalong speakers have shifted to the similar yet arguably distinct Bafia language.

References

Bafia languages
Languages of Cameroon
Endangered Niger–Congo languages